Heqing County is a county in the Dali Bai Autonomous Prefecture located in the northwest of Yunnan Province, China.

Administrative divisions
Heqing County has 7 towns, 1 township and 1 ethnic township. 
7 towns

1 township
 Jindun
1 ethnic township
 Liuhe Yi

Ethnic groups

Zhuang
There are 855 Zhuang in Heqing County, most of whom reside in Luolang Village 洛崀村, Duomei Township 朵美乡 (Dali Ethnic Gazetteer 2009:224). Yunnan (1979) lists the name Qing 青; their autonym is Buyi 布依, while the Han Chinese refer to them as the Zhongjiazi 仲家子. They believe that their ancestors had migrated from the Langdai 郎岱 area of Guizhou. They had a population of 161 as of 1960.

Climate

References

External links
 Heqing County Official Website

County-level divisions of Dali Bai Autonomous Prefecture